Bangladesh Institute of Nuclear Agriculture (BINA) is a research institute in Mymensingh, specialized in using nuclear and radiation technology in agricultural research.

History 
BINA was established in 1961 by the Pakistan Atomic Energy Commission (currently Bangladesh Atomic Energy Commission), and is now a national institute.  BINA has developed a number of varieties of different crops using the radiation technology.  For its contribution in the field of agricultural research, BINA has won national awards, most notably the President's Gold Medal.  Apart from its headquarter in Mymensingh, BINA has fourteen sub-stations at Comilla, Rangpur, Ishwardi, Magura, and Khulna.

Scientific divisions 
BINA has eight scientific divisions for conducting the research programs.
 Plant Breeding and Genetics, 
 Soil Science, 
 Crop Physiology, 
 Entomology, 
 Plant Pathology, 
 Agronomy, 
 Agriculture Engineering and Training, 
 Communication and Publication

Award
 President's Gold Medal
 Independence Day Award (2019)

References 

Research institutes in Bangladesh
Research institutes established in 1961
Recipients of the Independence Day Award
Agriculture research institutes in Bangladesh
1961 establishments in East Pakistan